Chavornay is the name of several places:

 Chavornay, Ain, a commune of the Ain département, in France
 Chavornay, Vaud, a municipality of the Vaud canton, in Switzerland